István Gilicz (20 August 1934 – 16 December 1993) was a Hungarian footballer. He played in three matches for the Hungary national football team from 1957 to 1959.

References

1934 births
1993 deaths
Hungarian footballers
Hungary international footballers
Place of birth missing
Association footballers not categorized by position